Breaking the Silence is the first EP by the Christian hard rock band The Letter Black. It was released on September 22, 2009, on Tooth & Nail Records.

Track listing

References

2009 EPs
The Letter Black albums